Aitovo (Ayıt) is a rural locality (a village) in Tangatarovsky Selsoviet, Burayevsky District, Bashkortostan, Russia. The population was 58 as of 2010. There is one street.

Geography 
Aitovo is located 39 km west of Burayevo (the district's administrative centre) by road. Sait-Kurzya is the nearest rural locality.

References 

Rural localities in Burayevsky District